Leonardo "Léo" Gamalho de Souza (born 30 January 1986) is a Brazilian footballer who plays as a striker for Vitória.

Career
Léo started his career in 2005 on Internacional's squad and transferred to Botafogo in 2006 and América in 2007.

In March 2009,he moved to China and signed a contract with Shenyang Dongjin. He moved to Shanghai Zobon in 2010.

In 2013 he signed with Ceará.

Honours

Individual
Copa do Brasil top scorer: 2014, 2017

References

External links
 
 
 

1986 births
Living people
Brazilian footballers
Brazilian expatriate footballers
Grêmio Foot-Ball Porto Alegrense players
Sport Club Internacional players
Botafogo de Futebol e Regatas players
América Futebol Clube (RN) players
Grêmio Barueri Futebol players
ABC Futebol Clube players
Sociedade Esportiva e Recreativa Caxias do Sul players
Ceará Sporting Club players
Santa Cruz Futebol Clube players
Avaí FC players
Club Nacional de Football players
Criciúma Esporte Clube players
Shenyang Dongjin players
Pudong Zobon players
Pohang Steelers players
Agremiação Sportiva Arapiraquense players
Esporte Clube Bahia players
Goiás Esporte Clube players
Associação Atlética Ponte Preta players
Clube de Regatas Brasil players
Al-Khor SC players
Campeonato Brasileiro Série A players
Campeonato Brasileiro Série B players
Campeonato Brasileiro Série C players
China League One players
Uruguayan Primera División players
K League 1 players
Qatar Stars League players
Association football forwards
Brazilian expatriate sportspeople in Portugal
Brazilian expatriate sportspeople in China
Brazilian expatriate sportspeople in Uruguay
Brazilian expatriate sportspeople in South Korea
Brazilian expatriate sportspeople in Qatar
Expatriate footballers in Portugal
Expatriate footballers in China
Expatriate footballers in Uruguay
Expatriate footballers in South Korea
Expatriate footballers in Qatar
Footballers from Porto Alegre